A modal filter, sometimes referred to as a point closure, is a road design that restricts the passage of certain types of vehicle. Modal filtering is often used to help create a low traffic neighbourhood (LTN), where motor traffic is diverted away from residential streets and instead toward feeder roads. Modal filters can be used to achieve filtered permeability within a transport network, and can encourage walking and cycling through more pleasant environments and improved safety.

Modal filters can be implemented through the use of barriers such as bollards, boom barriers and planters, though filters can also be implemented virtually through the use of automatic number-plate recognition cameras and road signs, which can allow residential motor access while prohibiting passing motor traffic.

Gallery

See also
 Road diet
Road infrastructure
Road safety
Street furniture
Streetworks
Traffic signs
Traffic calming

References